Ilm or ILM may refer to:

Acronyms 
 Identity Lifecycle Manager, a Microsoft Server Product
 I Love Money, a TV show on VH1
 Independent Loading Mechanism, a mounting system for CPU sockets
 Industrial Light & Magic, an American motion picture visual effects company
 Information lifecycle management, for computer data storage systems
 Infrastructure Lifecycle Management 
 Institute of Leadership and Management, the UK awarding body for leadership and management qualifications
 Internal Labour Market
 International Legal Materials, a law journal published by the American Society of International Law
 Inner limiting membrane, the innermost layer of the retina
 Insertion Loss Measurement, measurement of the loss, or attenuation, of a fibre-optic component or system
 Wilmington International Airport (IATA airport code), in Wilmington, North Carolina
 Independent loading mechanism, a retention device that holds the CPU in place

Geography 
 Ilm (Bavaria), a river in Germany, tributary to the Abens
 Ilm (Thuringia), a river in Germany, tributary to the Saale
 Ilm-Kreis, a district in Germany

Other uses 
 Ilm (Arabic), Arabic for knowledge, referring to knowledge of Islam and natural/social phenomenon
 I Love Music (forum), an internet music forum based in Canada
 Ilmr, a goddess in Norse mythology, sometimes written as Ilm